NaShawn Kearse (born 1972 in Brooklyn, New York) is an American television and film actor. Kearse has made television appearances in HBO series Entourage, as rapper Saigon's cousin; and in The Shield.

Kearse had a recurring part in ABC series Desperate Housewives, replacing the fired Page Kennedy in the role of Caleb Applewhite, a fugitive held captive in his mother (Alfre Woodard)'s basement.

Prior to Desperate Housewives, Kearse had roles in Taxi, Marci X, Cross Bronx, and as a voice of a pedestrian in the video game, Grand Theft Auto: San Andreas. Kearse co-starred in the 2007 film My Brother alongside Vanessa L. Williams. Kearse appeared as a sketch regular on Late Night with Conan O'Brien for several years in the late 1990s and early 2000s.

References

External links

American male television actors
African-American male actors
1972 births
Living people
People from Brooklyn
21st-century African-American people
20th-century African-American people